Palmersville can refer to:

 Palmersville, an area of Forest Hall, Tyne & Wear, United Kingdom
 Palmersville Metro station
 Palmersville, Tennessee, United States